Pizzo Muncréch is a mountain in the Swiss Lepontine Alps, overlooking Malvaglia in the canton of Ticino. It is located west of Piz di Strega, between the valleys of Combra and Pontirone.

References

External links
 Pizzo Muncréch on Hikr

Mountains of the Alps
Mountains of Switzerland
Mountains of Ticino
Lepontine Alps